Gorbiscape agelenoides, synonym Agelena agelenoides, is a species of spider in the family Agelenidae, which contains at least 1,350 species . It was first described by Walckenaer in 1842. It is commonly found in the western Mediterranean region.

References

Agelenidae
Spiders described in 1842